Anglagnostus is a genus of trilobite in the order Agnostida, which existed in what is now Shineton, England. It was described by Howell in 1935, and the type species is Anglagnostus dux, which was originally described as a species of Agnostus.

References

Agnostidae
Fossils of the United States